Die for You is a novel by bestselling author Lisa Unger. It is a standalone novel.

Awards and honors
Die for You was named a top book for summer on the Today show and Good Morning America. It was also chosen as a top book pick by Parade Magazine and Good Housekeeping Magazine.

References

2009 American novels
American crime novels
Novels by Lisa Unger
Shaye Areheart Books books